Terry A. Anderson (born October 27, 1947) is an American journalist. He reported for the Associated Press. In 1985, he was taken hostage by Shia Hezbollah militants of the Islamic Jihad Organization in Lebanon and held until 1991. In 2004, he ran unsuccessfully for the Ohio State Senate.

Early life
Anderson was born in Lorain, Ohio and raised in Batavia, New York. He graduated from Batavia High School in 1965. A professional journalist, he was in the United States Marine Corps for six years, serving as a combat journalist. He also served two tours of duty in Vietnam during the Vietnam War. After his discharge he enrolled at Iowa State University, graduating in 1974 with dual degrees: one in journalism and mass communication, the other in political science. He then joined the Associated Press, serving in Asia and Africa before being assigned to Lebanon as chief Middle Eastern correspondent in 1983.

Hostage in Lebanon

On March 16, 1985, Anderson had just finished a tennis game when he was abducted from the street in Beirut, placed in the trunk of a car, and taken to a secret location where he was imprisoned. For the next six years and nine months, he was held captive, being moved periodically to new sites. His captors were a group of Hezbollah Shiite Muslims who were supported by Iran in supposed retaliation for Israel's use of U.S. weapons and aid in its 1982–83 strikes against Muslim and Druze targets in Lebanon.  He was the longest-held of the American hostages captured in an effort to drive U.S. military forces from Lebanon during the Lebanese Civil War.

Held at the same time were several other U.S. citizens, including William Francis Buckley, CIA station chief in Beirut; Thomas Sutherland, an administrator at the American University of Beirut; Catholic priest, Father Lawrence Jenco; David P. Jacobsen, administrator at the American University Hospital of Beirut; Presbyterian minister Benjamin Weir; Jerry Levin, CNN's Beirut bureau chief; Frank Reed, head of the Lebanese International School; Joseph Cicippio, deputy controller of the American University of Beirut; Edward Tracy, a bookseller and writer in Beirut; and Professors Alann Steen, Jesse Turner and Robert Polhill.

Anderson was released on December 4, 1991, and says he has forgiven his captors.

Post-captivity life
Since his release, Anderson has taught courses at the Columbia Graduate School of Journalism and at the E.W. Scripps School of Journalism at Ohio University. He has also been a talk show guest, a columnist, and a radio talk-show host. He has written a best selling memoir of his experience as a hostage, titled Den of Lions. He filed suit against the Iranian government for his captivity, and in 2002 was awarded a multimillion-dollar settlement from frozen Iranian assets. Estimates put the amount he actually received at $26 million.

Anderson for some time lived in Nicholasville, Kentucky, teaching journalism and diversity at the University of Kentucky. In 2009, Anderson joined the faculty of the School of Journalism at the University of Kentucky in Lexington, Kentucky. In November 2009, he filed for bankruptcy under chapter 7. In 2011, he became a visiting professional at the S.I. Newhouse School of Public Communications at Syracuse University. In 2013, he acted as Honorary Chair of the Committee to Protect Journalists, a non-profit that supports press freedom around the globe. In 2014, he moved to Hidden Village in Gainesville, Florida, to teach a course in International Journalism at the University of Florida.

Philanthropy
With some of his settlement, Anderson and actress Kieu Chinh co-founded the Vietnam Children's Fund, which has built schools in Vietnam attended by more than 12,000 students.

He also created the Father Lawrence Jenco Foundation with a $100,000 endowment to honor and support people who do charitable and community service projects in Appalachia. Lawrence Jenco was a former Catholic Relief Services director in Beirut who also was kidnapped. The two men met in jail. Jenco, who died in 1996, wrote his memoirs, Bound to Forgive, for which Anderson wrote the preface.

2004 State Senate campaign
In December 2003 Terry Anderson announced his candidacy on the Democratic ticket to represent the 20th District in the Ohio Senate. His opponent was Republican candidate Joy Padgett, who had been appointed to the seat earlier in the term. Padgett ran controversial ads suggesting that Anderson would be soft on terrorism: the ads showed Anderson shaking hands with one of his former kidnappers. He received 46% of the vote in a district that leans Republican; the seat has been held by Republicans since 1977.

Personal life
Anderson has been married twice. He met his first wife, Mihoko "Mickey" Anderson, while he was a Marine stationed with the Armed Forces Radio and Television Service in Japan. They had one daughter, Gabrielle Anderson (born 1976). They later divorced. In 1982, he married a Lebanese native from a Maronite Christian family, Madeleine Bassil; they had one daughter, Sulome Anderson, born in 1985, three months after he was taken hostage, who later became a freelance journalist based in New York City and Beirut. She gained publicity for a photo depicting her kissing her formerly Orthodox Jewish boyfriend with a placard stating "Jews and Arabs REFUSE to be ENEMIES."

A fan of blues music, Anderson owned the Blue Gator from early 2002 until mid-2008, a blues bar in Athens, Ohio, which hosted regional and national acts.

In an interview in the spring 1995 newsletter of the School of Journalism Alumni Association, University of Nebraska–Lincoln, by Will Norton Jr., Anderson is quoted:
Is there going to be peace in the world? I'm a Christian. I believe eventually there will be, at the second coming. I think we are moving into an era of greater, or if not peace, at least of greater prosperity. Think about it: In the last 10 to 15 years there are hundreds of millions of people in the world who are living in a greater degree of individual responsibility and freedom and perhaps dignity than there were 15 years ago. That's true in eastern Europe, in Latin America, even in Asia. That great process of history, of thousands of years of an increase in a dignity of the individual, seems to have been halted for a good period of time by the growth of totalitarian societies, and those are breaking up now. Certainly the totalitarian instinct has not gone away. There are a great many wars going on and struggles by peoples, but that ice jam, that blockage that was representative of the domination of a third of the world by communism, is gone. I think that's reason for great optimism.

See also
List of kidnappings
List of solved missing person cases

References

External links

1947 births
21st-century American politicians
American male journalists
American people taken hostage
Associated Press reporters
Candidates in the 2004 United States elections
Columbia University faculty
Iowa State University alumni
Journalists from Ohio
Journalists from New York (state)
Kidnappings by Islamists
Living people
Missing person cases in Lebanon
Ohio Democrats
Ohio University faculty
People from Lorain, Ohio
People from Batavia, New York
Syracuse University faculty
University of Florida faculty
University of Kentucky faculty
United States Marines
United States Marine Corps personnel of the Vietnam War